The Dongyi or Eastern Yi was a collective term for ancient peoples found in Chinese records. The definition of Dongyi varied across the ages, but in most cases referred to inhabitants of eastern  China, then later, the Korean peninsula and Japanese Archipelago. As such, the name "Yí"  was something of a catch-all and was applied to different groups over time.
According to the earliest Chinese record, the Zuo Zhuan, the Shang Dynasty was attacked by King Wu of Zhou while attacking the Dongyi and collapsed afterward.

Ancient inhabitants of Eastern China 

Oracle bone inscriptions from the early 11th century BCE refer to campaigns by the late Shang king Di Yi against the Rénfāng, a group occupying the area of southern Shandong and Jianghuai (northern Anhui and Jiangsu).  Many Chinese archaeologists apply the historical name "Dongyi" to the archaeological Yueshi culture (1900–1500 BCE).  Other scholars, such as Fang Hui, consider this identification problematic because of the high frequency of migrations in prehistoric populations of the region.

Yi (夷) 

The Chinese word yí in Dōngyí has a long history and complex semantics.

Characters 

The modern Chinese regular script character  for yí combines radicals (recurring character elements) da 大 "big" and gong 弓 "bow", which are also seen in the seal script. However, yí was written in the earlier bronze script as a person wrapped with something, and in the earliest oracle bone script as a person with a bent back and legs.

The (121 CE) Shuowen Jiezi character dictionary, defines yí  as "people of the east" . The dictionary also informs that yí 夷 is not dissimilar from the Xià , which referred to the Chinese. Elsewhere in the Shuowen Jiezi, under the entry of qiang , the term yí is associated with benevolence and human longevity. Yí countries are therefore virtuous places where people live long lives. This is why Confucius wanted to go to yí countries when the dao could not be realized in the central states.

The scholar Léon Wieger provided multiple definitions to the term yí: "The men 大 armed with bows 弓, the primitive inhabitants, barbarians, borderers of the Eastern Sea, inhabitants of the South-West countries."

Bernhard Karlgren says that in the bronze script for yí inscribed on Zhou Dynasty (c. 1045 BCE – c. 256 BCE) Chinese bronze inscriptions, "The graph has 'man' and 'arrow', or 'arrow' with something wound around the shaft."

The Yi, or Dongyi, are associated with the bow and arrow: K. C. Wu says the modern character  designating the historical "Yí peoples", is composed of the characters for 大 "big (person)" and 弓 "bow"; which implies a big person carrying a bow, and also that this old form of this Chinese Character was composed with an association of a particular group of people with the use of the bow in mind. Some classic Chinese history records like Zuo Zhuan, Shuowen Jiezi, Classic of Rites, all have some similar records about this.

The earliest records of yi were inscribed on oracle bones dating from the late Shang Dynasty (c. 1600 – c. 1046 BCE). This oracle bone script was used interchangeably for yí 夷, rén  "human", and shī  "corpse; personator of the dead; inactive; lay out". The archeologist and scholar Guo Moruo believed the oracle graph for yi denotes "a dead body, i.e., the killed enemy", while the bronze graph denotes "a man bound by a rope, i.e., a prisoner or slave". The historical linguist Xu Zhongshu explains this oracle character depicts either a "corpse"' with two bent legs or a "barbarian" custom of sitting with one's legs stretched out instead of the Chinese norm of squatting on one's heels. The early China historian Li Feng says the Western Zhou bronze graph for Yí was "differentiated from rén 人 (human) by its kneeling gesture, clearly implying a population that was deemed a potential source of slaves or servants", thus meaning "foreign conquerable". Axel Schuessler hypothesizes an Old Chinese etymological development from *li 夷 "extend; expose; display; set out; spread out" to *lhi 尸 "to spread out; lie down flat (in order to sleep); motionless; to set forth (sacrificial dishes)", to "personator of a dead ancestor", and to "corpse".

Etymology and linguistic classification 
Historical linguists have tentatively reconstructed yí 夷's ancient pronunciations and etymology. The Modern Standard Chinese pronunciation yí descends from (c. 6th–9th centuries CE) Middle Chinese and (c. 6th–3rd centuries BCE) Old Chinese. Middle and Old Chinese reconstructions of yí 夷 "barbarian; spread out" include i < *djər, yij < *ljɨj, jiɪ < *lil, and ji < *ləi. As to the most recent reconstruction, William H. Baxter and Laurent Sagart (2014) reconstruct the Old Chinese name of yí 夷 as *ləj.

As Yuèjuèshū states that the Yue word for "sea" is also 夷 (*li → yí), Sinologist Axel Schuessler proposes an Austroasiatic etymology for the ethnonym *li by comparing to Khmer  dhle "sea", from Pre-Angkorian Old Khmer  danle(y) "large expanse of water"; thus the ethnonym might have referred to a people living by the sea, When analyzing possible Austroasiatic loanwords into Old Chinese, Schuessler noticed that one layer of loanwords, from one or more Austroasiatic language(s) into Old Chinese spoken in the Yellow River basin, showed affinities to modern Khmeric and Khmuic languages, and occasionally to Monic. Earlier, Edwin G. Pulleyblank (1983, 1999) also proposed that the Yi were Austroasiatic speakers. Laurent Sagart (2008) instead suggested that the Yi languages were ancestral to Austronesian languages and formed a sister-group to Sino-Tibetan.

Usages 
The sinologist Edwin G. Pulleyblank describes how Yi usages semantically changed.  "Their name furnished the primary Chinese term for 'barbarian' and is sometimes used in such a generalized sense as early as the Spring and Autumn period. At the same time, it continued to have a specific reference, denoting especially the Yi of the Huai River region, who constituted a recognized political entity. Paradoxically the Yi was considered the most 'civilized' of the non-Chinese peoples."

Pre-Qin usages 

It is not easy to determine people's times that a Classical Chinese document reflects.

Literature describing a pre-Xia Dynasty period does not use the character Yi. As for the Xià Dynasty, some groups of people are referred to as the Yi. For example, the Yu Gong chapter of the Shu Ji or Book of Documents terms people in Qingzhou and Xuzhou Laiyi, Yuyi and Huaiyi. Another Yi-related term is Jiu-Yi, literally Nine Yi, which could have also had the connotation The Numerous Yi or The Many Different Kinds of Yi, and which appears in a passage in The Analects that reads, "The Master (i.e., Confucius) desired to live among the Nine Yi." The term "Dongyi" is not used for this period.

Shang Dynasty oracle shell and bone writings record yi but not Dongyi. Shima Kunio's concordance of oracle inscriptions lists twenty occurrences of the script for 夷 or 尸, most frequently (6 times) in the compound zhishi 祉尸 "bless the personator; blessed personator". Michael Carr notes some contexts are ambiguous, but suggests, "Three compounds refer to 'barbarians' (in modern characters, fayi 伐夷 'attack barbarians', zhengyi 征夷 'punish barbarians', and yifang 夷方 'barbarian regions')." Oracle inscriptions record that Shang King Wu Ding (r. c. 1250–1192 BCE) made military expeditions on the Yi, and King Di Xin (r. c. 1075–1046 BCE) waged a massive campaign against the Yifang 夷方 "barbarian regions". It appears that the Yifang were the same people as Huaiyi (Huai River Yi), Nanhuaiyi (Southern Huai Yi), Nanyi (Southern Yi) and Dongyi according to bronzeware inscriptions of the Western Zhou Dynasty. The Zhou Dynasty attempted to keep the Yi under its control. The most notable example is the successful campaign against the Huaiyi and the Dongyi led by the Duke of Zhou.

On the other hand, historian Huang Yang notes that in the Shang period, "the term Yi probably did not carry the sense of 'barbarian'. Rather it simply denoted one of the many tribes or regions that were the target of the Shang military campaigns ... Therefore, we see that the Yi might have been a certain tribe or group of people that was neighboring the Shang."

During the Spring and Autumn period, Jin, Zheng, Qi and Song tried to seize control of the Huai River basin, which the Huaiyi occupied. Still, the region ultimately fell under the influence of Chu to the south. Simultaneously, people in the east and south ceased to be called Dongyi as they founded their own states. These Yifang states included the states of Xu, Lai, Zhongli, Ju and Jiang. The small state of Jie was based around present-day Jiaozhou. The state of Xu occupied large areas of modern Jiangsu and Anhui provinces between the Huai and Yangtze Rivers. Eventually, after warring with Chu and Wu, it was conquered by the State of Wu in 512 BCE. Chu annexed the State of Jiang, destroyed the State of Ju, whose territory was annexed by the State of Qi. Recent archaeological excavations reveal that the State of Xu's presence extended to western Jiangxi in modern Jing'an County. This includes bronzeware inscriptions about the State of Xu and a tomb with many nanmu coffins containing sacrificial female victims. Dongyi customs include burials with many sacrificial victims and veneration of the sun.

References to Dongyi became ideological during the Warring States period, owing to cultural changes in Chinese concepts of Self and Other. When the (c. 4th BCE) Classic of Rites recorded stereotypes about the Siyi "Four Barbarians" (Dongyi, Xirong, Nanman, and Beidi) in the four directions, Dongyi had acquired a clearly pejorative nuance.
The people of those five regions – the Middle states, and the [Rong], [Yi], (and other wild tribes around them) – had all their several natures, which they could not be made to alter. The tribes on the east were called [Yi]. They had their hair unbound and tattooed their bodies. Some of them ate their food without it being cooked. Those on the south were called Man. They tattooed their foreheads and had their feet turned in towards each other. Some of them (also) ate their food without it being cooked. Those on the west were called [Rong]. They had their hair unbound and wore skins. Some of them did not eat grain-food. Those on the north were called [Di]. They wore skins of animals and birds and dwelt in caves. Some of them also did not eat grain-food. The people of the Middle States, and of those [Yi], Man, [Rong], and [Di], all had their dwellings, where they lived at ease; their flavors which they preferred; the clothes suitable for them; their proper implements for use; and their vessels which they prepared in abundance. In those five regions, the people's languages were not mutually intelligible, and their likings and desires were different. To make what was in their minds apprehended, and to communicate their likings and desires, (there were officers) – in the east, called transmitters; in the south, representations; in the west, [Di-dis]; and in the north, interpreters.

Post-Qin usages 
The more "China" expanded, the further east the term "Dongyi" was applied to. The Records of the Grand Historian by Sima Qian uses the term "Manyi", but not "Dongyi". It puts the section of "Xinanyi (southwestern Yi) liezhuan (biographies)", but not "Dongyi liezhuan". The Book of Han does not put this section either but calls a Dongye chief in the Korean Peninsula as Dongyi. The Book of Later Han puts the section of "Dongyi liezhuan (東夷列傳)" and covers Buyeo, Yilou, Goguryeo, Eastern Okjeo, Hui, Samhan and Wa, in other words, eastern Manchuria, Korea, Japan and some other islands. The Book of Jin positioned Dongyi inside the section of "Siyi" (barbarians in four directions) along with "Xirong", "Nanman", and "Beidi". The Book of Sui, the Book of Tang and the New Book of Tang adopt the section of "Dongyi" and covers eastern Manchuria, Korea, Japan, and, optionally, Sakhalin and Taiwan. During the Song Dynasty, the official history books replaced Dongyi with Waiguo and Waiyi.

Other usage of Dongyi in Chinese history books 
 Records of the Grand Historian and Book of Han
 These two history books do not assign many chapters to describe the history of Dongyi. However, it includes the simple description Manchuria, Wiman Joseon and Wa. Wiman fled from the state of Yan to Gojoseon, and he disguised himself as a Gojoseon person. Book of Han uses the same term as Records of the Grand Historian.
 Book of the Later Han
 This book was written by Fan Ye. This book contains the chapter of 'Dongyi', which describes the history of Manchuria and Korea including Buyeo, Goguryeo, Okjeo, Dongye, and Samhan, and Japan including Wa. Like the Shuowen Jiezi, the Book of the Later Han also describes Dongyi countries as places where benevolence rules and the gentlemen do not die.
 Records of Three Kingdoms
 This book was written by Chen Shou, and also contains the chapter about 'Dongyi'. The chapter of "Wuwan Xianbei Dongyi" describes the Wuwan tribes, Xianbei tribes, and Dongyi tribes. In the section of Dongyi, this book explains the Manchurian, Korean and Japanese ancient kingdoms. Korean and Manchurian kingdoms include Buyeo, Goguryeo, Okjeo, Dongye, and Samhan. Japanese kingdom includes Wa (Japan).
 Book of Jin
 This book was written by  Fang Xuanling during the Tang dynasty. It has the chapter of 'Four Yi' and describes the Manchurian, Korean, and Japanese history. Manchurian, Korean and Japanese include Buyeo, Mahan confederacy, Jinhan confederacy, Sushen, and Wa (Japan).
 Book of Song
 This history book describes the history of Liu Song Dynasty and contains a simple explanation of the neighboring states. The Chapter of Dongyi of this book describes the ancient history of Manchuria, Korea and Japan such as Goguryeo, Baekje and Wa (Japan).
 Book of Qi
 The Book of Qi is the history book of Southern Qi. In the 58th volume, the history of Dongyi's history is described, which includes the ancient Manchurian, Korean, and Japanese history such as Goguryeo, Baekje, Gaya and Wa (Japan).
 History of Southern Dynasties
 This book is about the history of Liu Song, Southern Qi, Liang Dynasty, and Chen Dynasty and includes the history of Dongyi. In the chapter of Dongyi, this book describes the Manchurian, Korean, and Japanese history such as Goguryeo, Baekje, Silla, Wa (Japan), and so on. This book says that Dongyi's state was Gojoseon while Sima Qian says that Gojoseon people is Manyi.
 Book of Sui
 The Book of Sui describes the history of the Sui Dynasty, and was compiled at Tang dynasty. The chapter of Dongyi's history describes the history of Korean, Manchurian and Japanese such as Goguryeo, Baekje, Silla, Mohe, Liuqiu, and Wa (Japan).

See also 
 Lai (state)
 Ju (state) 
 Huawaizhidi
 Hua-Yi Distinction
 Shùn
 Sinocentrism
Gumie

References

Citations

Sources 

 Baxter, William H. 1992. A Handbook of Old Chinese Phonology. Mouton de Gruyter.
 Cai Fengshu 蔡鳳書, Kodai Santō bunka to kōryū 古代山東文化と交流, Higashi Ajia to hantō kūkan 東アジアと『半島空間』, pp. 45–58, 2003.
 Carr, Michael. 2007. "The Shi 'Corpse/Personator' Ceremony in Early China," in Marcel Kuijsten, ed., Reflections on the Dawn of Consciousness: Julian Jaynes's Bicameral Mind Theory Revisited, Julian Jaynes Society, 343–416.
 Karlgren, Bernhard. 1957. Grammata Serica Recensa. Museum of Far Eastern Antiquities.
 Li, Feng. 2006. Landscape And Power In Early China. Cambridge University Press.
 Li Xiaoding 李孝定. 1965. Jiagu wenzi zhishi 甲骨文字集釋 [Collected Explanations of Shell and Bone Characters]. 8 Vols. The Institute of History and Philology.

 Luan Fengshi 栾丰实, 论“夷”和“东夷” (On "Yi" and "Dong Yi"), Zhongyuan Wenwu 中原文物 (Cultural Relics of Central China), 2002.1, pp. 16–20.
 Matsumaru Michio 松丸道雄, Kanji kigen mondai no shintenkai 漢字起源問題の新展開, Chūgoku kodai no moji to bunka 中国古代の文字と文化, 1999.
 Matsumaru Michio 松丸道雄 and Takashima Ken'ichi 高嶋謙一 eds., Kōkotsumoji Jishaku Sōran 甲骨文字字釋綜覽, 1994.
 Schuessler, Axel. 2007. An Etymological Dictionary of Old Chinese. University of Hawaii Press.
 Schuessler, Axel. 2009. Minimal Old Chinese and Later Han Chinese. University of Hawaii Press.
 Shima Kunio 島邦男. 1971. Inkyo bokuji sōorui 殷墟卜辞綜類 [Concordance of Oracle Writings from the Ruins of Yin], 2nd rev. ed. Hoyu.
 Shirakawa Shizuka 白川静, Jitō 字統, 2004.
 Tang Jiahong 唐嘉弘, 东夷及其历史地位, Shixue yuekan 史学月刊, 1989.4, pp. 37–46.
Wu, K. C. (1982). The Chinese Heritage. New York: Crown Publishers. .
 Xu Guanghui 徐光輝, Kodai no bōgyo shūraku to seidōki bunka no kōryū 古代の防御集落と青銅器文化の交流, Higashi Ajia to hantō kūkan 東アジアと『半島空間』, pp. 21–44, 2003.
 Xu Zhongshu 徐中舒, ed. 1988. Jiaguwen zidian甲骨文字典 [Shell and Bone (i.e., Oracle) Character Dictionary]. Sichuan Cishu.

Further reading 
 Cohen, David Joel. 2001. The Yueshi culture, the Dong Yi, and the archaeology of ethnicity in early Bronze Age China. Ph.D. dissertation. Dept. of Anthropology, Harvard University.

External links 

 东夷文化及对中华文化的贡献 

Ancient peoples of China
Xia dynasty
Shang dynasty
Zhou dynasty
History of Shandong
History of Jiangsu
History of Anhui